James Anderson Davidson (8 November 1925 – 24 January 1996) was a Scottish footballer, who played for Partick Thistle, Inverness Caledonian and the Scotland national team.

Davidson joined Partick Thistle in 1945 and played for the Maryhill club for the next 15 years. During this time he helped the side to three League Cup finals (all lost) and gained selection to the Scottish League representative side four times. He also earned a total of eight caps for Scotland between 1954 and 1955, scoring once in a 2–2 draw with Northern Ireland in November 1954. He was part of the side which made Scotland's first appearance in the FIFA World Cup finals, in Switzerland in 1954.

Davidson left Partick in 1960, joining Highland League side Inverness Caledonian for three seasons. Upon his playing retirement he rejoined Partick as groundsman. His brother Andy was also a professional footballer, who holds the most appearances record for Hull City.

References

External links
Scotland B stats, www.fitbastats.com

1925 births
1996 deaths
People from Douglas Water
Footballers from South Lanarkshire
Association football central defenders
Scottish footballers
Partick Thistle F.C. players
Caledonian F.C. players
Scottish Football League players
Scotland international footballers
1954 FIFA World Cup players
Scotland B international footballers
Scottish Football League representative players
Highland Football League players
Place of death missing
Partick Thistle F.C. non-playing staff